Myklebost or Syvde is a village in Vanylven Municipality in Møre og Romsdal county, Norway.

The village was the administrative centre for the old municipality of Syvde which existed from 1918 until 1964 when it was merged into Vanylven Municipality.  The main church for the Syvde area is Syvde Church, located in Myklebost, right along the fjord.

References

Vanylven
Villages in Møre og Romsdal